The 2019 Copa Premier Centroamericana will be the first edition of the Copa Premier Centroamericana.

Invited teams

Competition format
The competition will be divided into two groups of four.  The top two will advance to the semifinals and the winners will compete for the cup.

Group stage

Group A

Group B

Knockout stage

Semi-finals

1st-leg

2nd-leg

Final

Goalscorers
Rony Martínez: 5 goals

References

Copa Premier Centroamericana